Gol Chul (also Romanized as Gol Chūl; also known as Gāl, Galoo, Galow, Galū, Geyāl, Giāl, Gyal, and Kalū) is a village in Jushin Rural District, Kharvana District, Varzaqan County, East Azerbaijan Province, Iran. At the 2006 census, its population was 172, in 33 families.

References 

Towns and villages in Varzaqan County